Soundtrack Recordings from the Film Jimi Hendrix is the soundtrack  to the documentary film Jimi Hendrix (1973). The double album was released by Reprise Records in July 1973. It contains the full-length live performances from the film and some clips from interviews (though not necessarily from the film). The album peaked at number 89 on the Billboard album chart, which generated concern at Reprise Records that repackaging old material would no longer satisfy the fans of Jimi Hendrix. The album has not been released on compact disc.

Film

The documentary (or rockumentary) was made in 1973 by Joe Boyd, John Head and Gary Weis for Warner Bros. The film contains concert footage from 1967 to 1970, including material from Isle of Wight and the Monterey Pop Festival. The film also includes interviews with Hendrix' contemporaries, family and friends. The estate of Jimi Hendrix authorized the 1973 film to be re-released on video and DVD in 1999, and a special edition DVD was released 2005.

LP track listing
Songs by Jimi Hendrix unless otherwise noted.

References

Albums produced by Joe Boyd
Live albums published posthumously
Jimi Hendrix live albums
1973 live albums
1973 soundtrack albums
Reprise Records live albums
Soundtracks published posthumously
Documentary film soundtracks